Westringia dampieri, commonly known as shore westringia, is a flowering plant in the family Lamiaceae, it grows in  South Australia and Western Australia. It is a small, dense shrub with white, mauve, cream or purple flowers.

Description
Westringia dampieri is a small shrub with more or less circular stems in cross section. Flowering occurs in late summer, winter and early to mid spring.

Taxonomy naming
Westringia dampieri was first formally described in 1810 by Scottish botanist Robert Brown based on specimens collected at King George Sound and the description was published in Prodromus Florae Novae Hollandiae et Insulae Van Diemen. The name has been misapplied to Westringia eremicola and Westringia senifolia. The specific epithet (dampieri) was named in honour of William Dampier.

Distribution and habitat
Shore westringia grows mostly on sandy soils in coastal locations or nearby on the west coast and south coast of Western Australia.

References

dampieri
Eudicots of Western Australia
Flora of South Australia